McNeill is an unincorporated community in Hardy County, West Virginia, United States. It lies near the South Branch Potomac River on Trough Road (County Route 6).

The community was named after the McNeill family, the original owners of the town site.

References

Unincorporated communities in Hardy County, West Virginia
Populated places on the South Branch Potomac River
Unincorporated communities in West Virginia